Astorino is a surname, and may refer to:

 Anita Astorino Kulik (born 1964), American politician

Louis D. Astorino (born 1948), Pittsburgh architect
 Rob Astorino (born 1967), New York politician

Surnames of Italian origin
Italian-language surnames